The VoloRegion is an electrically powered aircraft that can take off and land vertically (eVTOL). It is being developed by the German company Volocopter.

History 
The concept of the VoloConnect was presented first on May 17, 2021 at the EBACE Connect conference. The prototype was developed within two years in Munich under the direction of chief engineer Sebastian Mores. So far, only scaled-down prototypes have been tested in flight. The certification SC VTOL  enhanced (10−9) shall be reached within the next 5 years. The VoloRegion will be linked to the Volocopter software platform VoloIQ. In cooperation with Fraport, take-off and landing areas are planned which are necessary for the implementation of the urban air mobility concept. In October 2022 the VoloConnect was renamed and is now called the VoloRegion.

Design 
The VoloRegion has a multi-rotor system. It uses a hybrid lift and push design with a purely electric drive. It's equipped with 8 individual motors, 6 of which are connected to free propellers generate the lift and two to ducted propellers providing the forward thrust. There is a main high-wing wing with two outriggers for the 6 VTOL propellers. The stern is V-shaped. 
The lift of the VoloRegion is not only generated by propellers, as is usual with Volocopter, but also with its wings. This is energetically better.

Specifications

Usage 
The VoloRegion is designed for short range personal transport, it's connecting the suburbs to cities.

See also 
 List of rotorcraft
 Air taxi
 Boeing Passenger Air Vehicle
 Wisk Cora

References

External links 
 official VoloRegion site
 VoloRegion at Electric VTOL News

Proposed aircraft of Germany
Canard aircraft
Electric aircraft
VTOL aircraft
Urban air mobility
Volocopter aircraft
EVTOL aircraft